The A494 is a trunk road in Wales and England. The route, which is officially known as the Dolgellau to South of Birkenhead Trunk Road, runs between the terminus of the M56 motorway between Mollington and Capenhurst and the A470 at Dolgellau, Gwynedd. Its northern sections remain among the busiest roads in Wales.

History
The original routes into North Wales meant using fords when the Dee estuary was at low tide north west of Chester. But when the river was canalised in the 1730s several new coach roads were laid out through Sealand, Shotton and Queensferry. These were built by the Dee Company under the River Dee Act of 1743 to serve the hand-operated ferries which had replaced the fords.

By 1861 the ferry at Shotton was steam operated, with an engine house on the Queensferry side. In 1897 the ferry was replaced by an innovative retractable bridge because of increasing mechanised transport. The Queen Victoria Jubilee Toll Bridge, which was built from iron, stone and wood, could retract its middle sections for the passage of river traffic. However, by the early 1920s, increasing numbers of motor vehicles and the narrowness of the bridge made the area notorious for traffic congestion. These issues prompted its replacement.

In 1926 a rolling bascule bridge, called the New Jubilee Bridge, was opened by the Ministry of Transport for the newly named A494. Its design allowed river traffic to use the wharfs at Saltney. The original bridge was demolished although the stone abutments can still be seen today. 
The steel bridge remained the sole road crossing at Queensferry until the late 1950s.

But its size and design had limitations, a news report at the time stated it "is barely wide enough for two lines of vehicles, and five-mile traffic jams are normal". 
In the late 1960s, the A494 was upgraded to a dual carriageway from Drome corner. The original route through Shotton and Queensferry was bypassed after a wider fixed-arched bridge was constructed across the River Dee. This was facilitated by reduction of larger river traffic following the closure of the sea-going wharfs at Saltney.

The present route had remained unchanged until a lane upgrade in 2004.

Route

Queensferry to Ewloe

This section forms part of the North Wales coast route between Holyhead and the M56 motorway. The section of the A494 north of the River Dee was upgraded to four lanes plus hard shoulders in each direction in 2004 as part of a wider scheme, which upgraded the A550 as well, although not all of the lanes on the A494 have been opened.

The next stage of the scheme was to widen a  stretch of the A494 from the River Dee up Aston Hill to the Ewloe Interchange, the junction of the A55 and A494, to three and four-lane plus hard shoulder standard.

In April 2006, local residents living at Aston Hill, part of the proposed route, began a campaign to oppose any further widening of the A494. After 15 months, protesters' high-profile message had garnered more than 2,300 individual letters and numerous petitions rejecting the proposals. A planning inquiry was held in September and October 2007.

In March 2008 the proposals (in entirety) were ordered to be scrapped by Ieuan Wyn Jones, Deputy First Minister, responsible for Transport at the Welsh Assembly.

In reaching my decision I have taken account of the concerns raised by the inspector that the overall size of the scheme would have a significant impact on the landscape and would affect walking and cycling routes. I have also noted [the planning inspector's] remarks that while he considers that this section of the A494 will need some form of improvement in the foreseeable future, he considers that the scale of the scheme as originally proposed is greater than required.——Deputy First Minister Ieuan Wyn Jones

This part of the A494 will remain a two-lane dual carriageway and the speed limit will be . The decision has left a question mark over the future of the remaining upgrade at Ewloe Interchange.

Resentment also remains within the Aston Hill community as thirty households were evicted from their homes earlier in the scheme. These houses were earmarked to be demolished to make way for the road-widening works.

An upgrade "blue route" was again one of two options first published in 2015 to alleviate congestion in the Deeside corridor. The alternative route "red route" was eventually chosen which will route round the Deeside Industrial Estate and over the River Dee Bridge.

Ewloe to Corwen
Just past Ewloe interchange the A55 converges with the A494. At this point the dual carriageway becomes the A55 and the A494 diverges onto a single-carriageway trunk road. It is largely national speed limit with exceptions through urbanised areas.

The A494, which follows a largely unchanged historic route, passes Mold through the Clwydian Mountains, down to Ruthin and on to the market town of Corwen. Although it follows the traditional coach route, work has been undertaken over many decades to improve various sections of this road. For instance a bypass was completed in 1999 to allow traffic to avoid Mold's town centre. Likewise a dangerous road junction for Moel Famau, just outside Loggerheads, that was on a bend and blind brow has now been completely bypassed.

The A494 enters Ruthin by traversing the steep side of the Vale of Clwyd. Beyond the town, it heads south through several small villages. Beside the road for much of the way is the disused Ruthin to Corwen Railway line. The A494, up to this point, often remains congestion-free as a lot of traffic follows the parallel shorter A5104 between the A55 and Corwen around Llantysilio Mountain.

The A494 meets the A5 trunk road at a T-junction just outside Corwen. It now makes a short  concurrency with the A5 to Druid.

Druid to Dolgellau

The A494 diverges from the concurrency with the A5 at the road junction at Druid, Denbighshire.

This section of the A494 remains single carriageway. It has variable speed limits. North Wales Police regularly conduct traffic operations on this road.

The A494 enters the Snowdonia National Park just outside the market town of Bala.

Beyond the south west end of the lake, at the summit of the pass at Pant Gwyn, the A494 enters a long steeply graded valley that follows the River Wnion to Dolgellau. Again a former railway also runs parallel with the road. The remains of the line can be seen in places.

The A494 terminates at a T-junction with the A470 just outside the market town of Dolgellau beneath Cadair Idris.

See also
 Trunk roads in Wales

References

Sources

Motorways UK
Highways Agency
Aston Hill Project

Roads in Cheshire
Roads in Denbighshire
Roads in Flintshire
Roads in Gwynedd